Use Your Voice is the seventh studio album by American punk rock band H2O. It was released on Bridge 9 Records on October 9, 2015. The album was recorded from March to May 2015 at Buzzbomb Sound Lab Studios and produced by Chad Gilbert. H2O shot a video for "Skate" in June 2015. On February 15, 2016, the band released a second video for "True Romance" containing pictures of the band's families, friends and fans. The album hit #1 on Billboard Top Heatseekers chart and reached #86 on the Billboard 200 in October 2015.

Track listing

Personnel 
 Toby Morse – lead vocals
 Rusty Pistachio – guitars, backing vocals
 Adam Blake – bass
 Todd Friend – drums

Additional musicians
 Steve Caballero – guest guitar solo on "Skate"
 Michael Rapaport – guest speaker on "Black Sheep"

Production
 Chad Gilbert – production
 Paul Miner – engineering

Chart performance

References

H2O (American band) albums
2015 albums
Bridge 9 Records albums